Robert Patrick Maaskant (born 10 January 1969) is a Dutch former professional footballer and current manager, who played as a midfielder.

Club career
Maaskant played for Go Ahead Eagles, Emmen, Motherwell, Zwolle and Excelsior.

Managerial career
A former assistant at Go Ahead Eagles and Zwolle, Maaskant was named head coach of RBC Roosendaal for the 1999–2000 season. He worked there for three years, before joining Go Ahead Eagles. Maaskant worked in Deventer for seven months, came back to Roosendaal, and then moved on to Willem II in the summer of 2004. He was sacked on 21 November 2005 and replaced by Kees Zwamborn. On 4 January 2006, Maaskant was re-instated as the manager of RBC Roosendaal, as the successor of Dolf Roks. Maaskant was sacked in 2007 and signed a one-year contract with MVV Maastricht for the 2007–08 season with an option to extend it for two more years. In February 2008, he left MVV and signed for NAC Breda to be the auxiliary coach of Ernie Brandts. In the summer of the same year, as soon as Brandts left the Bredase club, Maaskant took the spot.

Maaskant had two rather successful seasons at NAC Breda. In the first season, NAC qualified for the UEFA Cup. In Maaskant's second season at NAC, the club nearly missed play-offs for the UEFA Cup. From May 2010 onwards, it appeared that NAC had financial problems. Directly afterwards, he raised his concerns via the press and Maaskant wasn't able to afford new players.

On 21 August 2010, NAC and Maaskant made public that he would leave NAC Breda for Polish football club Wisła Kraków, signing a two-year deal. Maaskant won the Polish championship in his first season at Wisła Kraków. However, he missed the qualification to the 2011–12 UEFA Champions League group stage. On 7 November 2011, a day after Wisła's first away loss against city rival Cracovia since 28 years, Wisła Kraków announced that they had parted ways with Maaskant.

On 1 May 2012, Maaskant joined Texas Dutch Lions as an advisor and head coach.

On 23 May 2012, Maaskant signed as head coach for Groningen. This was possible because of a clause in his Dutch Lions contract, that allowed him to leave early.

Groningen announced on 11 March 2013 that it would not be renewing its one-year contract with Maaskant.

In June 2013, Maaskant signed a one and a half-year contract with Belarusian side Dinamo Minsk.

In January 2014, Maaskant signed a one-year contract with the Columbus Crew in the Major League Soccer to be their assistant coach.

On 2 January 2015, it was announced that Maaskant had returned as head coach of Eredivisie side NAC Breda.

On 25 March 2017, Maaskant was appointed manager of Go Ahead Eagles for the remainder of the 2016–17 season.

Maaskant was appointed director of football at Almere City on 24 March 2018. He left the position at the end of the 2018–19 season to become manager of VVV-Venlo.

Honours
Wisła Kraków
Ekstraklasa: 2010–11

References

External links
Robert Maaskant at Wanadoo.nl 

1969 births
Living people
Footballers from Schiedam
Dutch footballers
Association football midfielders
Dutch expatriate footballers
Expatriate footballers in Scotland
Eerste Divisie players
Scottish Football League players
Go Ahead Eagles players
FC Emmen players
Motherwell F.C. players
PEC Zwolle players
Excelsior Rotterdam players
Dutch football managers
Columbus Crew non-playing staff
Eredivisie managers
Eerste Divisie managers
RBC Roosendaal managers
Go Ahead Eagles managers
Willem II (football club) managers
MVV Maastricht managers
NAC Breda managers
Wisła Kraków managers
FC Groningen managers
FC Dinamo Minsk managers
VVV-Venlo managers
PEC Zwolle non-playing staff
Dutch expatriate football managers
Expatriate football managers in Poland
Dutch expatriate sportspeople in Poland
Expatriate football managers in Belarus
Dutch expatriate sportspeople in Belarus
Expatriate soccer managers in the United States
Dutch expatriate sportspeople in the United States